Richard William Brian Harradine (9 January 1935 – 14 April 2014) was an Australian politician who served as an independent member of the Australian Senate, from 1975 to 2005, representing the state of Tasmania. He was the longest-serving independent federal politician in Australian history, and a Father of the Senate.

Early life
Harradine was born in Quorn, South Australia, and moved to Tasmania in 1959.

Political career
He was an official for the Federated Clerks' Union. He then served from 1964 to 1976 as Secretary-General of the Tasmanian Trades and Labour Council and a member of the executive of the Australian Council of Trade Unions.

In 1968, the Federal Executive of the Australian Labor Party (ALP) refused to let Harradine take his seat on the body. He was suspected of links with the Democratic Labor Party, and had declared that "the friends of the Communists intend to try and silence me". The Executive's actions prompted ALP leader Gough Whitlam, who had supported Harradine, to resign and seek a renewed mandate from the caucus. He was re-elected by a narrow margin, 38 votes to 32, in a ballot against Jim Cairns.

In 1975, the Federal Executive, by a majority of only one vote, expelled Harradine. It subsequently rejected, by the same margin, an attempt to convene a special conference to hear his appeal. The Executive's action came after the Tasmanian State Executive declined to expel him. He had been accused of involvement with the National Civic Council.

He decided to contest the 1975 election as an independent for the Senate, and won comfortably. Thereafter, he remained a senator until deciding not to contest the 2004 election. His term expired on 30 June 2005.

From 1993 to 1999, Harradine and Mal Colston were joint Fathers of the Senate. Between 1999 and 2005, Harradine held the title alone.

He was a particularly important figure in the Senate between 1994 and 1999. (See Australian Senate for the Senate numbers.) From December 1994 to March 1996, the make-up of the Senate meant that Harradine's vote combined with that of Labor and the Australian Democrats was just enough to pass Labor government legislation, making his support extremely valuable to either side of politics. Then, after the March 1996 election and the resignation from the Labor Party by the disgraced Colston, Harradine's and Colston's votes were sufficient to pass Coalition legislation, notably the Native Title Amendment Act 1998 (also known as the "Wik ten-point plan") and the partial privatisation of Telstra. He secured $350 million in communications and environmental funding for Tasmania in return for backing the Telstra legislation. However, he refused to support the Goods and Services Tax. After 1 July 1999, the Coalition needed four extra votes to pass Senate legislation so Harradine's vote became less important.

He was socially conservative, reflecting his Catholic values. He opposed abortion, embryonic stem cell research, same-sex marriage, and pornography. He secured a ministerial veto on importation of the abortifacient RU486, and a prohibition on Australian overseas aid financing family planning that included abortion advice.

Death
He died in April 2014 at his home, in Tasmania, aged 79. He had suffered several strokes prior to his death. Prime Minister Tony Abbott offered Harradine's family a state funeral, which was accepted. The funeral was held on 23 April 2014 at St Mary's Cathedral, Hobart.

References

Further reading
 Fitzsimmons, Hamish. "Brian Harradine dead". ABC Lateline 14 April 2014
 Kingston, Margo. "Brian Harridine, man of honour". The Sydney Morning Herald, 29 June 2004 
 Crawford, Wayne. "Brian Harradine, the epitome of the definition of independent". Mercury, Hobart, 20 April 2014

1935 births
2014 deaths
Independent members of the Parliament of Australia
Members of the Australian Senate
Members of the Australian Senate for Tasmania
Australian trade unionists
Australian Roman Catholics
Australian anti-abortion activists
People from Quorn, South Australia
21st-century Australian politicians
20th-century Australian politicians